Mirosław Kochalski (born 13 October 1965) was the Mayor of Warsaw (interim - after Lech Kaczyński was elected President of Poland).

References
Profile on wprost.pl 

1965 births
Living people
People from Iława
Mayors of Warsaw
National School of Public Administration (Poland) alumni
Nicolaus Copernicus University in Toruń alumni
SGH Warsaw School of Economics alumni